Josephine Garis Cochran (later Cochrane; March 8, 1839 – August 3, 1913) was an American inventor who invented the first successful hand-powered dishwasher, which she designed and then constructed with the assistance of mechanic George Butters, who became one of her first employees.

Once her patent issued on 28 December 1886, she founded Garis-Cochrane Manufacturing Company to manufacture her machines. Cochrane showed her new machine at the World's Columbian Exposition in Chicago in 1893 where nine Garis-Cochran washers were installed in the restaurants and pavilions of the fair and was met with interest from restaurants and hotels, where hot water access was not an issue. She won the prize for "best mechanical construction, durability and adaptation to its line of work" at the Fair. Garis-Cochran Manufacturing Company, which built dishwashers, grew through a focus on hotels and other commercial customers and was renamed as Cochran's Crescent Washing Machine Company in 1897.
 
Cochran's Crescent Washing Machine Company became part of KitchenAid through acquisition by Hobart Manufacturing Company after Cochran's death in 1913. Cochran was posthumously inducted into the National Inventors Hall of Fame in 2006 for patent 355,139 issued on December 28, 1886, for her invention of the dishwasher.

Biography 
Cochrane was born Josephine Garis in Ashtabula County, Ohio, on March 8, 1839, and raised in Valparaiso, Indiana. She was the daughter of John Garis, a civil engineer, and Irene Fitch Garis, as well as the granddaughter of an innovator.

After moving to her sister's home in Shelbyville, Illinois, she married William Cochrane on October 13, 1858. William had returned the year before from a disappointing try at the California Gold Rush but had gone on to become a prosperous dry goods merchant and Democratic Party politician. Josephine and William had 2 children: Hallie and  Katharine.

In 1870 the family moved into a mansion, and Cochrane joined Chicago society. After one dinner party, some of the heirloom dishes got chipped while being washed, prompting her to search for a better alternative to handwashing.  She also wanted to relieve tired housewives from the duty of washing dishes after a meal.

Cochrane’s dishwasher 
Other attempts had been made to produce a commercially viable dishwasher.  In 1850 Joel Houghton designed a hand-cranked dish soaker.  In the 1860s, L. A. Alexander improved on the device with a geared mechanism that allowed the user to spin racked dishes through a tub of water.  Neither of these devices was particularly effective.

Josephine Cochrane's invention of the dishwashing machine eventually became a success. However, this not only took a great deal of time and effort, but she also faced numerous obstacles in her journey to becoming a successful female innovator. Following the death of her husband in 1883, Cochrane was left with only $1,535.59 and a significant amount of debt, which she had to pay off. This not only put her in a position of distress and mourning but also motivated her to create this innovation that she was passionate about and urgently needed to sustain herself financially. The death of her husband also put Cochrane in a trying position as a woman. She had to bring her invention to life, get a patent on it, find customers and sell her product to them all alone, with little to no representation or help from the male figures in her life. At the time, this would be difficult for any woman, no matter what their background or position was. In the following years, she worked hard on bringing her innovation to market, with little money, technical knowledge, and help to develop the mechanics of her pressurized dishwashing machine.

After filing her first patent application on December, 31st, 1885, she began developing a prototype of her product, bringing her vision to light. Cochrane designed the first model of her dishwasher in the shed behind her house in Shelbyville, Illinois. George Butters was a mechanic who assisted her in the construction of the dishwasher. He was also an employee at the first dishwasher factory. To build the machine, she first measured the dishes and built wire compartments, each specially designed to fit either plates, cups, or saucers. The compartments were placed inside a wheel that lay flat inside a copper boiler. A motor turned the wheel while hot soapy water squirted up from the bottom of the boiler and rained down on the dishes. Their dishwasher was the first to use water pressure instead of scrubbers to clean the dishes inside the machine. She received a patent on December 28, 1886.

Another challenge she faced was selling her product to individual households, specifically housewives. The first dishwashers were too expensive for an average household, costing between $75 and $100, which most women would not spend on an item for their kitchen even if it meant easing the effort they had to put in washing dishes. In addition, most homes in that era were not equipped to handle the machine's requirements in using hot water. However, years later, homes began adding boilers that were big enough to meet those requirements, eventually allowing Cochrane to sell to housewives, which initially was her end goal.

The World's Columbian Exposition in 1893 proved to be a pivotal in Cochrane's business as other companies relying heavily on investors were wiped out the same year in the Panic of 1893. The exposition proved a great place to pitch her innovation, and it worked well as many restaurants  and hotels placed orders (with colleges and hospitals delayed in following due to sanitation requirements). 
In 1898, she opened her own factory with George Butters as manager so she could extend her sales north and south, reaching from Mexico to Alaska. Closer to her death, she recounted the hardship she faced through her journey and admits that if she knew all that she knew today, she might not have ventured to innovate the dishwasher due to all the hassles. However, she is glad that she did.

Her main customers continued to be hotels and restaurants. It was not until the 1950s that dishwashers became popular for home usage.  Cochrane died in 1913 at 74. In 1926, her company was sold to KitchenAid, now part of Whirlpool Corporation.

Death and recognition 
Cochrane died of a stroke or exhaustion in Chicago, Illinois, on August 3, 1913, and was buried in Glenwood Cemetery in Shelbyville, Illinois. In 2006 she was inducted into the National Inventors Hall of Fame.

References

External links

19th-century American inventors
People from Shelbyville, Illinois
1839 births
1913 deaths
Women inventors
People from Ashtabula County, Ohio
People from Valparaiso, Indiana